The British Jumping Derby meeting – known as the Al Shira'aa Hickstead Derby Meeting – is an annual showjumping event held since 1961 at the Hickstead in June every year. It is considered one of the premier events in the equestrian calendar.

A highlight of the meeting is the Al Shira'aa Derby, a 1,195-metre course with tricky jumps including the aptly named Devil's Dyke – three fences in short succession with a water-filled ditch in the middle and the difficult Derby Bank, a jump with 3 ft 5in rails on top and a 10 ft 6in slope down the front.

Derby fences
The main arena is used for a number of classes throughout the meeting (and at the Royal International Horse Show amongst others), but the main Derby class always follows the same class, consisting of the following fences of 21 jumping efforts:

Results
The results of the main British Jumping Derby class at the show are as follows:

In 2019, Michael Pender became the youngest ever winner of the Hickstead Derby, taking the title from Marion Coakes when she won the Derby in 1967 on Stroller. Five riders have won the Hickstead Derby four times apiece - Eddie Macken, Harvey Smith, John Whitaker, Michael Whitaker and William Funnell. In 2020 and 2021, the Hickstead Derby did not run because of the Coronavirus pandemic.

Sponsorship
Title sponsors in recent years have included furniture retailer DFS, floor and bed furnishing retailer carpetright and online retailer Equestrian.com. The current title sponsors are Al Shira'aa, who have signed a three-year deal as title sponsor of the event, now known as the Al Shira'aa Hickstead Derby meeting.

External links
 Official British Jumping Derby website

References

Show jumping events
Equestrian sports in the United Kingdom
Equestrian sports in England
1962 establishments in the United Kingdom
Recurring sporting events established in 1962